The 36th New Zealand Parliament was a term of the New Zealand Parliament. It was elected at the 1969 general election on 29 November of that year.

1969 general election

The 1969 general election was held on Saturday, 29 November.

Sessions
The 36th Parliament sat for three sessions, and was prorogued on 20 October 1972.

Ministries
He was succeeded by Jack Marshall, who formed the Marshall Ministry on 7 February of that year. The second National Government was defeated at the 25 November .

Overview of seats
The table below shows the number of MPs in each party following the 1969 election and at dissolution:

Notes
The Working Government majority is calculated as all Government MPs less all other parties.

Initial composition of the 36th Parliament

By-elections during 36th Parliament
There was one by-election held during the term of the 36th Parliament.

Notes

References

36